The crested agouti (Dasyprocta cristata) is a species of rodent in the family Dasyproctidae. It is endemic to Guyana and Suriname. Its taxonomic status is uncertain and it may be synonymous with Dasyprocta leporina, leading the IUCN to rate it as Data Deficient.

References

Dasyprocta
Mammals of Suriname
Endemic fauna of Suriname
Mammals described in 1816
Taxonomy articles created by Polbot
Taxobox binomials not recognized by IUCN